Yenikənd is a municipality and village in the Qabala Rayon of Azerbaijan. It has a population of 5,000.

References

Populated places in Qabala District